The largest rivers of Moldova include:

References

 
Moldova
Rivers